Marilyn Marler is an American politician. She is a Democrat representing the 90th district in the Montana House of Representatives.

Political career 

Marler was a member of the City Council of Missoula, Montana from 2006 to 2018.

In 2018, Ellie Hill, former District 90 representative in the Montana House of Representatives, was unable to run for reelection due to term limits, and Marler ran for the open seat. She defeated Republican Nick Knowles with 67.8% of the vote.

As of July 2020, Marler sits on the following committees:
 Natural Resources
 Taxation
 Local Government
 Legislative Administration

Electoral record

Personal life 

Marler holds a Bachelor's degree from University of California, Davis and a Master's degree from the University of Montana, both in Biology. She has been a Natural Areas Specialist at the University of Montana since 1998.

References 

Year of birth missing (living people)
Living people
Politicians from Missoula, Montana
University of California, Davis alumni
University of Montana alumni
Montana city council members
Democratic Party members of the Montana House of Representatives
Women state legislators in Montana
21st-century American politicians
21st-century American women politicians